Lavras do Sul is a Brazilian municipality in the southwestern part of the state of Rio Grande do Sul. It is in the Campanha Meridional micro-region and the Sudoeste Rio-Grandense meso-region. The population is 7,444 (2020 est.) in an area of 2600.60 km². The Camaquã River flows through the municipality.

Bounding municipalities

Bagé
Dom Pedrito
Caçapava do Sul
São Gabriel

References

External links
http://www.citybrazil.com.br/rs/lavrasdosul/ 

Municipalities in Rio Grande do Sul